CCRT is the abbreviation for:
Cape Cod Rail Trail, paved rail trail located on Cape Cod in Massachusetts
Centre for Cultural Resources and Training, autonomous organisation under Ministry of Culture of Government of India
Core conflictual relationship theme, psychoanalytic tool developed by Lester Luborsky